The 2014 Gerry Weber Open was a tennis tournament played on outdoor grass courts. It was the 22nd edition of the event known that year as the Gerry Weber Open and is part of the ATP World Tour 250 series of the 2014 ATP World Tour. It took place at the Gerry Weber Stadion in Halle, Germany, between 9 and 15 June 2014.

Points and prize money

Point distribution

Prize money 

* per team

Singles main-draw entrants

Seeds 

 1 Rankings are as of May 26, 2014.

Other entrants 
The following players received wildcards into the singles main draw:
  Dustin Brown
  Peter Gojowczyk
  Jan-Lennard Struff

The following players received entry from the qualifying draw:
  Pierre-Hugues Herbert
  Andrey Kuznetsov
  Illya Marchenko
  Mate Pavić

The following player received entry as a lucky loser:
  Albano Olivetti

Withdrawals
Before the tournament
  Tommy Haas → replaced by  Albano Olivetti
  Guillermo García López → replaced by  Michał Przysiężny
  Florian Mayer → replaced by  Steve Johnson
  Janko Tipsarević → replaced by  Benjamin Becker

During the tournament
  Teymuraz Gabashvili
  Lu Yen-hsun

Doubles main-draw entrants

Seeds 

 Rankings are as of May 26, 2014.

Other entrants 
The following pairs received wildcards into the doubles main draw:
  Dustin Brown /  Jan-Lennard Struff
  Marco Chiudinelli /  Roger Federer

The following pair received entry as alternates:
  Benjamin Becker /  Teymuraz Gabashvili

Withdrawals 
Before the tournament
  Robert Farah (right wrist injury)
  Andreas Seppi (virus)

During the tournament
  Łukasz Kubot (left heel injury)

Retirements 
  Teymuraz Gabashvili (right knee injury)

Finals

Singles 

  Roger Federer defeated  Alejandro Falla, 7–6(7–2), 7–6(7–3)

Doubles 

  Andre Begemann /  Julian Knowle defeated  Marco Chiudinelli /  Roger Federer, 1–6, 7–5, [12–10]

External links 
 Official website